Abkhazia is a region in the Caucuses that is under the effective control of the partially recognised self-declared Republic of Abkhazia. The de jure majority internationally recognized Autonomous Republic of Abkhazia claims to be its legitimate government.

Republic of Abkhazia 

The coat of arms of the Republic of Abkhazia was adopted by the Supreme Soviet of Abkhazia on 23 July 1992, after it unilaterally declared its secession from Georgia.

The emblem of separatist Republic of Abkhazia is a shield divided vertically into white and green. On this are placed devices outlined in gold:
 At the base eight-pointed star, in the upper part of both the white and the green field are set two eight-pointed stars. 
 At the centre of the shield is a horseman, flying on the fabulous steed called Arash, and shooting an arrow towards the stars. This scene is from the heroic epic Narts.

Green symbolizes youth and life, while white symbolizes spirituality. The stars represent the sun, as well as the union of the East and West.

Autonomous Republic of Abkhazia
The Government of the Autonomous Republic of Abkhazia has adopted a seal which carries the name of the autonomous republic in Georgian and Abkhaz and depicts the House of the Government in Sukhumi.

A coat of arms has been proposed for the Government of the Autonomous Republic of Abkhazia by the State Council of Heraldry. These arms are quartered and depict an image of St George in the first quarter, the seven green and white stripes from the Abkhazia flag in the second and third quarters and the arms of the Shervashidze family in the fourth.

Historical Coat of Arms

See also 
 Coat of arms of the SSR Abkhazia
 Flag of Abkhazia

References 

 Flags of Abkhazia, Georgia

Abkhazia
Abkhazia
National symbols of Abkhazia
Abkhazia
House of Shervashidze